Ian Thomas Wood (born 15 January 1948 in Radcliffe, Lancashire, England) is an English former footballer whose fifteen years service and record breaking 525 appearances for Oldham Athletic made him a Boundary Park legend.

References

External links

1948 births
Living people
English footballers
People from Radcliffe, Greater Manchester
Association football defenders
Oldham Athletic A.F.C. players
Denver Dynamos players
San Jose Earthquakes (1974–1988) players
Burnley F.C. players
Wichita Wings players
Radcliffe F.C. players
English Football League players
North American Soccer League (1968–1984) players
English expatriate sportspeople in the United States
Expatriate soccer players in the United States
English expatriate footballers